Borowiany  is a village in the administrative district of Gmina Zębowice, within Olesno County, Opole Voivodeship, in south-western Poland.

The village has a population of 140.

References

Borowiany